Lou Qinjian (born 21 December 1956) is a Chinese politician and computer scientist who had served as Communist Party Secretary of Jiangsu, Communist Party Secretary, Governor of Shaanxi and Deputy Minister of Industry and Information Technology. He has a Ph.D. in computer science from Huazhong University of Science and Technology.

Early life and career
Lou Qinjian was born in Tongzi County, Guizhou province, near the Communist revolutionary base of Zunyi.  He started working in August 1973 as a rusticated youth in Tongzi and later worked  as a teacher. He joined the Communist Party of China (CPC) in August 1975.

IT and engineering
After the Cultural Revolution, in March 1978 Lou was admitted to the Computer Science and Engineering Department of Huazhong University of Science and Technology in Wuhan, Hubei province.  After graduating in February 1982, Lou worked at the 15th Research Institute of the Ministry of Electronics Industry as an assistant engineer until 1985.  From 1985 to 1988 he enrolled as a graduate student at the 15th Research Institute, earning a master's degree in Engineering.  Afterwards he continued to work at the 15th Research Institute as an engineer, rising through the ranks to become its director in 1995 and General Manager and President of its affiliated Taiji Computer Corporation.  From 1998 to 2003 he returned to study at the Computer Science and Engineering Department of the Huazhong University of Science and Technology, earning a Ph.D.

In March 2008 Lou Qinjian was appointed Vice Minister of Industry and Information Technology of China, a position he held until 2010.

Shaanxi Province
In August 2010 Lou Qinjian was transferred from the national government to Shaanxi province, where he became a Vice Governor.  In December 2012 he was appointed acting governor, replacing Zhao Zhengyong, who was promoted to Communist Party Chief of the province. In January 2013 Lou was elected Governor by the Shaanxi Provincial Congress. On 27 March 2016, he was elevated to Communist Party Chief of Shaanxi, again succeeding Zhao.

Jiangsu Province
In October 2017, Lou was transferred to Jiangsu Province, and appointed as the Party Chief.

Lou is a full member of the 19th Central Committee of the CPC. He has also served as an alternate member of the 18th Central Committee, deputy to the 16th, 17th and 18th National Congress of the CPC, deputy to the 12th Shaanxi Provincial Congress of the CPC, and deputy to the 11th Shaanxi Provincial People's Congress.

Central government
On 23 October 2021, he was appointed vice chairperson of the National People's Congress Financial and Economic Affairs Committee.

References 

Living people
1956 births
Governors of Shaanxi
Chinese Communist Party politicians from Guizhou
People's Republic of China politicians from Guizhou
Huazhong University of Science and Technology alumni
People from Zunyi
Engineers from Guizhou
Alternate members of the 18th Central Committee of the Chinese Communist Party
Members of the 19th Central Committee of the Chinese Communist Party
Deputy Communist Party secretaries of Shaanxi